Nibe is a town with a population of 5,433 (1 January 2022), located in Region North Jutland on the Jutland Peninsula in northern Denmark. The town is located in a geographic region known as Himmerland. Nibe was the site of the municipal council of Nibe Municipality. The town is known for hosting an annual music festival called Nibe festival, where big musicians such as Katy Perry, Bryan Adams and Volbeat have performed.

Notable people 

 Jens Peter Dahl-Jensen (1874 in Nibe – 1960) a Danish sculptor
 Otto Fog-Petersen (1914 in Nibe - 2003) a journalist, editor-in-chief of Berlingske Aftenavis
 Louis Jensen (born 1943 in Nibe) an author of flash fiction, metafiction, prose poetry and magical realism
 Ole Thestrup (1948–2018) a Danish actor 
 Ole Henriksen (born 1951 in Nibe) a skin cosmetician and manufacturer of skin care products on Sunset Boulevard in Los Angeles, California
 Marie Askehave (born 1973 in Nibe) a Danish actress and singer

Sport 
 Jørn Sørensen (born 1936 in Nibe) a retired football striker, played 31 games and scored six goals for Denmark
 Per Gade (born 1977 in Nibe) a former Danish football player, 126 club caps with AC Horsens

External links
 Official website (in Danish)
 Municipality's official website

References

 Municipal statistics: NetBorger Kommunefakta, delivered from KMD aka Kommunedata (Municipal Data)
 Municipal mergers and neighbors: Eniro new municipalities map

 
Former municipalities of Denmark
Cities and towns in the North Jutland Region
Towns and settlements in Aalborg Municipality